371st may refer to:

371st Bombardment Squadron, inactive United States Air Force unit
371st Engineer Construction Battalion or 371st Engineer Battalion, activated as a Special Service Regiment in the United States Army in 1944
371st Fighter Group or 142nd Fighter Wing, a unit of the Oregon Air National Guard, stationed at Portland Air National Guard Base, Oregon
371st Fighter Squadron or 127th Wing, composite unit of the Michigan Air National Guard, stationed at Selfridge Air National Guard Base, Michigan
371st Infantry Regiment (United States), an African American regiment, nominally a part of the 93rd Infantry Division (Colored), that served in World War I
371st Sustainment Brigade (United States), Ohio Army National Guard sustainment Brigade

See also
371 (number)
371, the year 371 (CCCLXXI) of the Julian calendar
371 BC